Horace Orlando Ivory (born August 8, 1954) is a former American football running back in the NFL from 1977 through 1982. He attended Nolan Catholic High School from 1968 to 1972 where he was a TCIL All-State Running Back. He was offered a football scholarship to Notre Dame University but for academic reasons, went to Navarro Junior College before transferring to the University of Oklahoma for his junior and senior seasons. 

Horace was a member of two national championship teams while at Oklahoma  

He was named to the NFL All-Pro team as a kick returner after the 1980 season with the Patriots 

Living people
1954 births
American football running backs
Navarro Bulldogs football players
Oklahoma Sooners football players
New England Patriots players
Seattle Seahawks players